Cape Blanche Conservation Park is a protected area located on the west coast of Eyre Peninsula in South Australia about  south of Streaky Bay.  It was proclaimed under the National Parks and Wildlife Act 1972 in 2012 for the purpose of protecting ‘important breeding habitat for the eastern osprey (Pandion cristatus) and white-bellied sea-eagle (Haliaeetus leucogaster)’ and ‘diverse range of flora’ including ‘the West Coast mintbush (Prostanthera calycina),’ and to provide ‘provide important habitat for threatened shorebirds and migratory birds, including the hooded plover (Thinornis rubricollis), sooty oystercatcher(Haematopus fuliginosus) and sanderling (Calidris alba).’  The conservation park is classified as an IUCN Category III protected area.

References

External links
Cape Blanche Conservation Park webpage on protected planet

Conservation parks of South Australia
Protected areas established in 2012
2012 establishments in Australia
Eyre Peninsula